is a Japanese film director, screenwriter, and actor. Including Yutaka Ikejima, Yumi Yoshiyuki and Minoru Kunizawa, Araki is one of the four top pink film directors of Ōkura Productions (OP) at the turn of the millennium.

Life and career
Tarō Araki first entered the film industry as an extra in 1981. He began his behind-the-camera work through Kokuei studio in 1985. There he worked as assistant director on such films as Yukio Kitazawa's Wet Virgin: Obscene Assault (1985) and Kazuhiro Sano's first film as director,  aka Last Bullet. Araki often appears as an actor in his films as well as in films by  other directors.

Araki has a more populist impulse to his filmmaking, and is a vocal opponent of making a film to please one's self rather than the audience. He intentionally tries to please the traditional theatrical pink film audience, particularly those outside the large cities, rather than the more intellectual critics and fans who are represented by P*G magazine and the Pink Grand Prix ceremony. Nevertheless, Araki has proven himself a successful director at the Pink Grand Prix. Besides the acting and Best New Director awards, Araki's film Sad and Painful Search: Office Lady Essay (2000) was chosen as Best Film, and his Sister-in-Law's Wet Thighs (2001) earned Araki an award for Best Director. Additionally, he has had numerous films on the Pink Grand Prix's yearly Top-Ten list.

Partial filmography

Pink Grand Prix
 2000 1st place: 
 2001 4th place: 
 2001 Honorable mention: 
 2002 7th place: 
 2002 10th place: 
 2003 6th place: 
 2003 8th place: 
 2004 2nd place: 
 2008 7th place:

Pinky Ribbon Awards
 2004 Gold prize: 
 2004 Pearl prize: 
 2005 Silver prize:

Bibliography

English

Japanese

References

 
|-
! colspan="3" style="background: #DAA520;" | Pink Grand Prix
|-

Japanese male film actors
Pink film actors
Japanese film directors
Pink film directors
Japanese screenwriters
1961 births
Living people